Leny may refer to:

People
 Leny Andrade (born 1943), Brazilian singer and musician
 Leny Marenbach (1907–1984), German film actress
 Leny Zwalve (fl. 1977), Dutch cartoonist

Places
 Leny (civil parish), Ireland
 Leny, County Westmeath, Ireland

Other
 Leny or Garbh Uisge, a Scottish river

See also
 Lenny (disambiguation)